Mikołaj Krasicki (died 1652) was a Roman Catholic prelate who served as Auxiliary Bishop of Lutsk (1639–1652) and Titular Bishop of Argos (1639–1652).

Biography
On 3 October 1639, Mikołaj Krasicki was appointed during the papacy of Pope Innocent X as Auxiliary Bishop of Lutsk and Titular Bishop of Argos. He served as Auxiliary Bishop of Lutsk until his death in 1652.

References

External links and additional sources
 (for Chronology of Bishops) 
 (for Chronology of Bishops)  
 (for Chronology of Bishops) 
 (for Chronology of Bishops)  

17th-century Roman Catholic bishops in the Polish–Lithuanian Commonwealth
Bishops appointed by Pope Innocent X
1652 deaths